Christopher Kasparek (born 1945) is a Scottish-born writer of Polish descent who has translated works by numerous authors, including Ignacy Krasicki, Bolesław Prus, Florian Znaniecki, Władysław Tatarkiewicz, Marian Rejewski, and Władysław Kozaczuk, as well as the Polish–Lithuanian Constitution of 3 May 1791.

He has published papers on the history of the World War II era; Enigma decryption; Bolesław Prus and his novel Pharaoh; the theory and practice of translation; logology (science of science); multiple independent discovery; psychiatric nosology; and electronic health records.

Life
Born in Edinburgh, Scotland, to Józef and Stanisława (Sylvia) Kasparek, World War II Polish Armed Forces (both of them, Army and Air Force) veterans, Kasparek lived several years in London, England, before sailing with his family in December 1951 in the Queen Elizabeth to the United States.

In 1966 he graduated with a Bachelor of Arts degree, magna cum laude, Phi Beta Kappa, and with a University of California Citation for Outstanding Undergraduate Achievement, from the University of California, Berkeley, where he had studied Polish literature with the future (1980) Nobel laureate Czesław Miłosz.

In 1978 Kasparek received a medical degree from Warsaw Medical School, in Poland.  For 33 years, 1983–2016, he practiced psychiatry in California.

Writer
Kasparek has translated works by historian of philosophy Władysław Tatarkiewicz ("The Concept of Poetry," 1975; On Perfection, 1979; A History of Six Ideas: an Essay in Aesthetics, 1980); military historian Władysław Kozaczuk (Enigma: How the German Machine Cipher Was Broken, and How It Was Read by the Allies in World War Two, 1984); short-story writer, novelist, and philosopher Bolesław Prus (On Discoveries and Inventions; several stories; Pharaoh, translated from the Polish, with foreword and notes, by Christopher Kasparek, Amazon Kindle e-book, 2020, ASIN:BO8MDN6CZV); and other Polish authors.

Kasparek's translation of the Constitution of 3 May 1791 (published 1985 and republished in many venues), is available — augmented with his translation of the Free Royal Cities Act — on Wikisource.

His translations of verse include selected Fables and Parables by Ignacy Krasicki.

Bibliography
A partial list of works written or translated by Christopher Kasparek:

Articles 
 "The Social Case of the Theory of Relativity: Why They Know Not What They Do, and How They Know Anything At All", The Daily Californian, vol. 195, no. 6 (Tuesday, July 11, 1967) – Weekly Magazine [section], issue number 26, volume 2 (July 11, 1967) – pp. 5–6, 8.  
 review of Robert Olby, The Path to the Double Helix: The Discovery of DNA (1974), in Zagadnienia Naukoznawstwa (Logology [or] Science of Science; a quarterly), Warsaw, Polish Academy of Sciences, vol. 14, no 3, 1978, pp. 461–63. 
 with Richard A. Woytak, "In Memoriam Marian Rejewski", Cryptologia, vol. 6, no. 1 (January 1982), pp. 19–25.
 "The Translator's Endless Toil", The Polish Review, vol. XXVIII, no. 2, 1983, pp. 83–87. 
 with Richard A. Woytak, "The Top Secret of World War II", The Polish Review, vol. XXVIII, no. 2, 1983, pp. 98–103. 
 "National System?", Psychiatric News, 21 December 1990, p. 17. Proposal to create an internet-linked system of computerized individual medical records which, with proper privacy safeguards, would make an individual's health history available to his attending physician, wherever the individual might find himself. This could prevent needless delays and errors in medical treatment and create an anonymized data source for epidemiological studies. 
 "Psychiatry and Special Interests", The Psychiatric Times, February 1991, p. 6. Discussed, among other things, are public confusion of psychiatry with psychology; the desirability of greater terminological clarity in psychiatry, e.g. by spelling "Post-Traumatic-Stress Disorder" with the two hyphens rather than with just the first hyphen; psychiatry's peculiar practice of capitalizing the names of psychiatric disorders ("internal medicine... does not need to capitalize hepatitis or myocardial infarction"); and a suggestion to replace the diagnostic term "schizophrenia" (which the lay public has often misread as "split personality") with "psychosis", which is, to all practical purposes, an orphan term. 
 "Prescribing Privileges", Psychiatric News, vol. XXVI, no. 18 (20 September 1991), p. 17.  Reductio ad absurdum of some psychologists' request that they be granted medication-prescribing privileges.
 "Time to Rename Schizophrenia", Clinical Psychiatry News, vol. 21, no. 8 (August 1993), p. 6. Proposal that the last psychiatric nosological entity still bearing a recondite Greek name be renamed to something more comprehensible, such as "psychosis". A precedent is the renaming of the former "paranoia" to the more descriptive "delusional disorder". (All the other "psychotic disorders" have their own specific names, and lumping them together as "psychoses" has no theoretical or practical advantage, especially since psychiatry's abandonment of the former antithetic term "neurosis"; thus the "psychosis" category is now essentially vacant.) A similar suggestion has since been made, in 2009, by psychiatrist Jim van Os, who has proposed that "schizophrenia" be renamed to "psychotic spectrum disorder".
 "Prus' Pharaoh: the Creation of a Historical Novel", The Polish Review, vol. XXXIX, no. 1, 1994, pp. 45–50.
 "Two Micro-stories by Bolesław Prus", The Polish Review, vol. XL, no. 1, 1995, pp. 99–103.
 "Prus' Pharaoh: Primer on Power", The Polish Review, vol. XL, no. 3, 1995, pp. 331–34.
 "Prus' Pharaoh and the Wieliczka Salt Mine", The Polish Review, vol. XLII, no. 3, 1997, pp. 349–55.
 "Prus' Pharaoh and the Solar Eclipse", The Polish Review, vol. XLII, no. 4, 1997, pp. 471–78.
 "Enigma and Poland Revisited", The Polish Review, vol. XLVII, no. 1, 2002, pp. 97–103.
 "A Futurological Note: Prus on H.G. Wells and the Year 2000," The Polish Review, vol. XLVIII, no. 1, 2003, pp. 89–100.
 partial "Corrigendum" – to Christopher Kasparek's "A Futurological Note: Prus on H.G. Wells and the Year 2000" – in The Polish Review, vol. XLVIII, no. 3, 2003, p. 387. 
 "Krystyna Skarbek:  Re-viewing Britain's Legendary Polish Agent", The Polish Review, vol. XLIX, no. 3, 2004, pp. 945–953.
 letter to the editor – responding to "Krystyna Skarbek: a Letter" from Ronald Nowicki, pp. 93–101 in vol. L, no. 1, 2005 – in The Polish Review, vol. L, no. 2, 2005, pp. 253–55, including corrections to typographical errors in Christopher Kasparek's article on Krystyna Skarbek in The Polish Review,  vol. XLIX, no. 3, 2004.
 review of Michael Alfred Peszke, The Polish Underground Army, the Western Allies, and the Failure of Strategic Unity in World War II, foreword by Piotr S. Wandycz, Jefferson, North Carolina, McFarland and Company, 2005, in The Polish Review, vol. L, no. 2, 2005, pp. 237–41.
 review of Michael Alfred Peszke, The Armed Forces of Poland in the West, 1939–46: Strategic Concepts, Planning, Limited Success but No Victory!, Solihull, Helion, 2013, ; and Polskie siły abrojne na Zachodzie, 1939-1946: Koncepcje strategiczne i realia geopolityki [The Polish Armed Forces in the West, 1939-1946: Strategic Concepts and Geopolitical Realities], translated [into Polish] by Tomasz Fiedorek, Poznań, Dom Wydawniczy Rebis, 2014, ; in The Polish Review, vol. 61, no. 1, 2016, pp. 101–102.

Translations
 Ignacy Krasicki, Fables and Parables, 1779
 Constitution of 3 May 1791
 Bolesław Prus, On Discoveries and Inventions (public lecture, 1873), by Aleksander Głowacki (Bolesław Prus's birth name) 
 Bolesław Prus, "Fading Voices" (microstory, 1883)
 Bolesław Prus, "Mold of the Earth" (microstory, 1884); reprinted in electronic and book venues, including Alan Ziegler, ed., Short: An International Anthology of Five Centuries of Short-Short Stories, Prose Poems, Brief Essays, and Other Short Prose Forms, New York, Persea Books, 2014, pp. 35–37.
 Bolesław Prus, "The Living Telegraph" (microstory, 1884)
 Bolesław Prus, "Shades" (microstory, 1885)
 Bolesław Prus, "A Legend of Old Egypt" (short story, 1888)
 Bolesław Prus, Pharaoh (historical novel, 1895) – Pharaoh, translated from the Polish by Christopher Kasparek, illustrated by Ewa Bogucka, Warsaw, Polonia Publishers, 1991, 
 Bolesław Prus, Pharaoh (historical novel, 1895) – Pharaoh, translated from the Polish by Christopher Kasparek, Warsaw, Polestar Publications, 2001, . A slightly revised translation of Pharaoh.
 Bolesław Prus, Pharaoh (historical novel, 1895) – Pharaoh, translated from the Polish, with foreword and notes, by Christopher Kasparek, Amazon Kindle e-book, 2020, ASIN:BO8MDN6CZV. A further refined translation of Pharaoh.
 Bolesław Prus, The Most General Life Ideals (excerpts from book, 2nd ed., 1905)
 Eugeniusz Geblewicz, "An Analysis of the Concept of Goal", in Wojciech Gasparski and Tadeusz Pszczołowski, editors, Praxiological Studies: Polish Contributions to the Science of Efficient Action, Dordrecht, D. Reidel Publishing Company, 1983, ISBN 83-01-03910-8, pp. 47–60. (Paper first published as "Analiza pojęcia celu" in Przegląd Filozoficzny [Philosophical Review] 3/4, Warsaw, 1932.)
 Władysław Tatarkiewicz, Zarys dziejów filozofii w Polsce (A Brief History of Philosophy in Poland), Kraków, Polish Academy of Learning, 1948 – the first half appeared as "Outline of the History of Philosophy in Poland" in The Polish Review, vol. XVIII, no. 3, 1973, pp. 73–85  
 Władysław Tatarkiewicz, "The Concept of Poetry", Dialectics and Humanism: The Polish Philosophical Quarterly, vol. II, no. 2 (spring 1975), pp. 13–24.
 Władysław Tatarkiewicz, "Closing Address", Dialectics and Humanism: The Polish Philosophical Quarterly, vol. III, no. 2 (spring 1976), pp. 168–70. Address delivered by Professor Tatarkiewicz at a scholarly conference honoring his 90th birthday; it anticipates some themes of his Wspomnienia (Memoirs) published in 1979. 
 Władysław Tatarkiewicz, "Creativity: History of the Concept", Dialectics and Humanism: The Polish Philosophical Quarterly, vol. IV, no. 3 (summer 1977), pp. 48–63.
 Władysław Tatarkiewicz, O doskonałości (1976 book) – the English translation, On Perfection, was serialized 1979–81 in Dialectics and Humanism: The Polish Philosophical Quarterly, and was reprinted in the book, Władysław Tatarkiewicz, On perfection, Warsaw University Press, 1992, pp. 9–51 (the latter English-language book is a collection of papers by and about the late Professor Tatarkiewicz).
 Władysław Tatarkiewicz, A History of Six Ideas: An Essay in Aesthetics, The Hague, Martinus Nijhoff, 1980, 
 Florian Znaniecki, "The Subject Matter and Tasks of the Science of Knowledge" (1923), in Bohdan Walentynowicz, ed., Polish Contributions to the Science of Science, Dordrecht, Holland, D. Reidel Publishing Company, 1982, pp. 1–81.
 Tadeusz Kotarbiński, "A Review of Questions in the Science of Science" (1965), in Bohdan Walentynowicz, ed., Polish Contributions to the Science of Science, Dordrecht, Holland, D. Reidel Publishing Company, 1982, pp. 96–125.  
 Richard A. Woytak, "A Conversation with Marian Rejewski (transcribed and translated by Christopher Kasparek)", Cryptologia, vol. 6, no. 1 (January 1982), pp. 50–60. Highlights of Woytak's 24 July 1978 interview, and of letters from Rejewski to Woytak between 26 October 1978 and 25 November 1979. 
 Marian Rejewski, "Remarks on Appendix 1 to British Intelligence in the Second World War by F.H. Hinsley", Cryptologia, vol. 6, no. 1 (January 1982), pp. 75–83. Rejewski drew up these "Remarks" expressly for Richard Woytak.
 Eugeniusz Geblewicz, "An Analysis of the Concept of Goal" (1932), in Wojciech Gasparski and Tadeusz Pszczołowski, eds., Praxiological Studies: Polish Contributions to the Science of Efficient Action, Dordrecht, Holland, D. Reidel Publishing Company, 1983, pp. 47–59. 
 Władysław Kozaczuk, Enigma: How the German Machine Cipher Was Broken, and How It Was Read by the Allies in World War II, edited and translated by Christopher Kasparek, Frederick, Maryland, University Publications of America, 1984,

Notes

References
 "Kasparek, Christopher," Who's Who in Polish America, 1996–1997, New York, Bicentennial Publishing Corp., 1996, p. 186.
  "Christopher Kasparek" Cited by Google Scholar
 Bibliographic essay: A world at arms by Gerhard L. Weinberg;  Enigma by Kozaczuk, trans. by Christopher Kasparek. University Publications of America, Frederic MD, 1984.

External links

The Translator's Endless Toil  (paper by Christopher Kasparek in The Polish Review, 1983).

1945 births
Living people
University of California, Berkeley alumni
American people of Polish descent
American psychiatrists
American male non-fiction writers
20th-century American historians
20th-century American male writers
21st-century American historians
21st-century American male writers
American translators
American translation scholars
Translators from Polish
Polish–English translators